The Batthyány Society of Professors is a Hungarian association of conservative university professors founded in 1995 as a non-governmental organization. Members are committed to what they call "traditional European social virtues" and they aim to "give intellectual stimulation to the Hungarian nation thereby contributing to its spiritual and economic development". The society supports political parties and politicians who "work for a 'civic' Hungary".

The Society is affiliated with the Lajos Batthyány Foundation, an association aiming at the promotion of a "Hungarian political mentality committed to the Hungarian people and nation, focussing on European unity and resting on common Christian values and a democratic parliamentary governing".

Renowned members
As of March 2012 the Society has 213 members. Some of the more renowned are:
Attila Borhidi- Biologist
Tamás Freund - Neurobiologist
Balázs Gulyás- Neurobiologist
József Hámori - Politician and Biologist
Zsolt Liposits - Neuroendocrinologist
András Prékopa - Mathematician
György Szabad - Politician and Historian
Eörs Szathmáry - Biologist
Tivadar Tulassay - Physician
Tar Pál- businessman and diplomat pediatrician, Rector of the Semmelweis University between 2003 and 2012

References

Politics of Hungary